G24 may refer to:
 G24 Anti-Materiel Rifle, used by the German Armed Forces
 Bondei language, a Bantu language of Tanzania
 
 Group of 24, a grouping of developing countries
 , a Tribal-class destroyer of the Royal Canadian Navy
 Junkers G 24, a German aircraft